Kim Min-seong (born 3 December 1994) is a South Korean bobsledder. She competed in the two-woman event at the 2018 Winter Olympics.

References

1994 births
Living people
South Korean female bobsledders
Olympic bobsledders of South Korea
Bobsledders at the 2018 Winter Olympics
Place of birth missing (living people)